Canna 'Madame Crozy' is a medium-sized 'Crozy Group' canna cultivar; green foliage, large, ovoid shaped, branching habit; oval stems, coloured red; spikes of flowers are open, scarlet with a narrow gold margin, throat gold with vermilion spots, staminodes are medium size, edges regular, petals red, fully self-cleaning; fertile both ways, not true to type, self-pollinating; rhizomes are thick, up to 3 cm in diameter, coloured purple; tillering is prolific. It was introduced by A. Crozy, Lyon, France in 1890 and was named in honour of his wife. It was awarded the RHS Award of Garden Merit (AGM), in 1890.

It is hardy to USDA Zone 7 ( -15 °C) and can be grown in fertile and moist soils which are well drained.

Synonyms
 Canna 'Mrs Cozy'
 Canna 'Mrs Croky',

See also
 Canna
 List of Canna species
 List of Canna cultivars
 List of Canna hybridists

References

 RHS Journal of 1890
 RHS Journal of 1891
 RHS Journal of 1894
 Garden & Forest, 1894
 L'Illustration Horticole, 15 March 1895
 RHS Journal of 1895
 RHS Journal of 1898-9
 RHS Journal of 1899–1900
 Railton & Co., Australia, 1900–1903
 RHS Journal of 1908-9
 Cassells Dictionary of Practical Gardening, Walter P. Wright, 1910
 Tropical Plants & Gardening, 1935
 Inter-State Nurseries, Hamburg, Iowa, USA. Catalogue 1939
 Westover Nursery, Clayton, USA. Catalog 1939
 Burgess Seed and Plant Co, Catalogue 1939
 Burgess Seed and Plant Co, Catalogue 1941
 Tropical Planting and Gardening, H.F. MacMillan, 5th Edition, 1954
 The Popular Encyclopaedia of Gardening, H.H. Thomas and Gordon Forsyth, 1955
 KAVB International Canna Checklist, September 2004

External links
 Botanical Gardens, Lyon, France, EU

Cannaceae
Ornamental plant cultivars